The Iren Dabasu Formation (also known as Erlian Formation) is a Late Cretaceous geologic formation in the Iren Nor region of Inner Mongolia. Dinosaur remains diagnostic to the genus level are among the fossils that have been recovered from the formation. The formation was first described and defined by Henry Fairfield Osborn in 1922 and it is located in the Iren Nor region of China.

Geology
It comprises continental clastic sediments consisting of light grey fine sandstones, coarse sandstones and glutenites as well as mottled claystones and siltstones. The fine-grained floodplain sediments and the coarse-grained sediments of the point bar formed a series of repeated frequently binary sedimentary rhythms. The “binary structure” of the sedimentary rhythms strongly indicates meandering stream deposits rather than braided river deposits as previously thought. As indicated by the fluvial and lacustrine sedimentation, the Iren Dabasu Formation was a large floodplain terrain with braided rivers and meanders that supported extensive vegetation, evidenced on the prominent palaeosol development and the numerous remains from herbivorous dinosaurs. Egg nests, caliche and paleosols seem to indicate periodic subaerial intervals, in addition, the presence of plesiosaur and hybodont shark remains (which are also known in the Bayan Shireh Formation) are indicatives of a river system with connections to the ocean.

Correlations
Based on the ostracod and charophyte assemblages of the Iren Dabasu Formation, Itterbeeck et al. 2005 suggested a potential correlation with those of the Nemegt Formation, making its age Late Campanian to Early Maastrichtian. However, vertebrates point to an older date than the Campanian-Maastrichtian ages, the supposed deposition of ostracods were likely due to climatic conditions rather than age. The turtle Khunnuchelys is known from both Iren Dabasu and Bayan Shireh equivalent units such as the Bostobe and Bissekty. In addition, a giant caenagnathid similar to Gigantoraptor is now known from the Bayan Shireh Formation at the locality of Tsagan Teg. Like the coeval Bayan Shireh Formation (and possibly Javkhlant Formation) in the Gobi Desert, the dinosaur fauna of the Iren Dabasu Formation includes tyrannosauroids, ornithomimids, therizinosaurs and oviraptorosaurs.

However, strong evidence coming from biostratigraphic occurrences seems to support a correlation with the Bayan Shireh Formation, at least, with the upper boundary. For instance, both formations bear similar dinosaur taxa, such as therizinosaurs (Erlikosaurus, Segnosaurus, Erliansaurus or Neimongosaurus) and ornithomimosaurs (Garudimimus or Archaeornithomimus), these similarities are even more intensified by the discovery of Gigantoraptor and the giant unnamed caenagnathid from Bayan Shireh. In addition, the potential discovery of Alectrosaurus in both formations seems to be another indicative of a correlation. Consequently, Averianov and Sues estimated the formation to be Santonian in age, roughly about 86 million and 83 million years ago. However, palynological correlations suggest a Maastrichtian age. Guo et al. 2018 supported a Late Cretaceous age based on U–Pb and paleomagnetic analyses, with a maximum depositional age of around 95.8 ± 6.2 million years ago. A 2022 study describing new ornithomimosaurian material, however, suggested that while the vertebrate faunal assemblage indicates that the age of the formation is likely Turonian based on its similarity to the Bissekty Formation of Uzbekistan, the invertebrate faunal assemblage indicates a much later age (Campanian-Maastrichtian).

Fossil content
The Iren Dabasu Formation is rich on dinosaur fauna, with multiple species described, in the other hand, mammals seem to be extremely absent. Compared, the fossil taxa between Iren Dabasu and Bayan Shireh are very similar, most notably therizinosaurs, tyrannosauroids, oviraptorosaurs and turtles. Although Gigantoraptor is the only described oviraptorosaur from the formation, Funston et al. 2019 described a new avimimid bonebed containing numerous individuals at different growth stages. Nevertheless, the fossils lacked enough diagnosis to be confined to a separate genus and species. Deinonychosaurs are not very common across the formation, however an indeterminate troodontid about the size of Saurornithoides is known from three isolated specimens. An isolated humerus of a pterosaur has also been found in this formation.

Dinosaurs

Theropods

Ornithopods

Sauropods

Flora

Angiosperms

Gymnosperms

Spores

See also

 List of dinosaur-bearing rock formations
 List of Asian dinosaurs
 Laurasia
 Geology of Mongolia
 Cretaceous Mongolia

References

Geologic formations of China
Upper Cretaceous Series of Asia
Cretaceous China
Sandstone formations
Shale formations
Siltstone formations
Fluvial deposits
Lacustrine deposits
Ooliferous formations
Paleontology in Inner Mongolia